Mighty Like a Rose is the second album by American jazz saxophonist Eddie Harris recorded in 1961 and released on the Vee-Jay label.

Reception
The Allmusic review states "Harris' playing strikes a balance between cool bop and straightforward soul-jazz, though it's possible to hear the influence of Detroiter Yusef Lateef beginning to creep in. It's all well-executed, and Harris' command of the highest ranges of his instrument is as lovely as ever, making this date worthwhile for anyone who loved the sound of Exodus to Jazz".

Track listing
All compositions by Eddie Harris except as indicated
 "My Buddy" (Walter Donaldson, Gus Kahn) - 5:33 
 "Willow Weep for Me" (Ann Ronell) - 3:49 
 "Spartacus" (Alex North) - 4:35 
 "Mighty Like a Rose" (Frank Lebby Stanton, Ethelbert Nevin) - 2:06 
 "God Bless the Child" (Billie Holiday, Arthur Herzog, Jr.) - 3:48 
 "Sally T." - 3:34 
 "Fontessa" (John Lewis) - 5:19 
 "There Is No Time" - 2:16

Personnel
Eddie Harris - tenor saxophone
Willie Pickens - piano
Joe Diorio - guitar
Bill Yancey - bass
Harold Jones - drums

References 

Eddie Harris albums
1961 albums
Vee-Jay Records albums